Jeannie Callum is a transfusion medicine specialist and hematologist in Ontario, Canada. She is also a professor at the University of Toronto and Queen's University. She was the co-principal investigator of the CONCOR trial, an international randomized controlled trial evaluating the use of convalescent plasma for the treatment of COVID-19 infection. She was lead editor for Bloody Easy 4: Blood Transfusions, Blood Alternatives and Transfusion Reactions, fourth edition a handbook in transfusion medicine for the province of Ontario.

Further reading

References

Living people
Year of birth missing (living people)
Canadian hematologists
Academic staff of the University of Toronto
Women hematologists
Academic staff of Queen's University at Kingston